Lucas Joachim Matzerath (born 3 May 2000) is a German swimmer. He competed in the men's 50 metre breaststroke event at the 2020 European Aquatics Championships, in Budapest, Hungary.

References

External links
 

2000 births
Living people
German male swimmers
German male breaststroke swimmers
Swimmers at the 2020 Summer Olympics
Olympic swimmers of Germany
People from Weinheim
Sportspeople from Karlsruhe (region)
21st-century German people
European Aquatics Championships medalists in swimming